A Soul's Awakening is a 1922 British silent drama film directed by W. P. Kellino and starring David Hawthorne, Flora le Breton and Ethel Oliver. It was made at Lime Grove Studios in Shepherd's Bush. It is also known by the alternative title What Love Can Do.

Cast
 David Hawthorne as Ben Rackstraw 
 Flora le Breton as Maggie Rackstraw 
 Ethel Oliver as Sal Lee 
 Maurice Thompson as Jim Rackstraw 
 Sylvia Caine as Cynthia Dare 
 Philip Desborough as Cecil Wayne 
 Tom Morris as Mike Nolan

References

Bibliography
 Low, Rachael. History of the British Film, 1918–1929. George Allen & Unwin, 1971.

1922 films
1922 drama films
British drama films
British silent feature films
Films directed by W. P. Kellino
Films shot at Lime Grove Studios
British black-and-white films
1920s English-language films
1920s British films
Silent drama films